Sheshdeh (also Romanized as Shash Deh, Shesh Deh, and Shish Deh) is a city and capital of Sheshdeh and Qarah Bulaq District, in Fasa County, Fars Province, Iran.  At the 2006 census, its population was 5,572, in 1,283 families.

References

Populated places in Fasa County

Cities in Fars Province